VESA, formally known as Video Electronics Standards Association, is an American technical standards organization for computer display standards. The organization was incorporated in California in July 1989 and has its office in San Jose. It claims a membership of over 300 companies.

In November 1988, NEC Home Electronics announced its creation of the association to develop and promote a Super VGA computer display standard as a successor to IBM's proprietary Video Graphics Array (VGA) display standard. Super VGA enabled graphics display resolutions up to 800×600 pixels, compared to VGA's maximum resolution of  640×480 pixels—a 56% increase.

The organization has since issued several additional standards related to computer video displays. Widely used VESA standards include DisplayHDR, DisplayPort, and Flat Display Mounting Interface.

Standards 
 Feature connector (VFC), obsolete connector that was often present on older videocards, used as an 8-bit video bus to other devices
 VESA Advanced Feature Connector (VAFC), newer version of the VFC that widens the bus to either a 16-bit or 32-bit bus
 VESA Local Bus (VLB), once used as a fast video bus (akin to the more recent Accelerated Graphics Port (AGP))
 VESA BIOS Extensions (VBE), used for enabling standard support for advanced video modes
 Display Data Channel (DDC), a data link protocol which allows a host device to control an attached display and communicate EDID, DPMS, MCCS and similar messages
 Extended Display Identification Data (E-EDID), a data format for display identification data
 Monitor Control Command Set (MCCS), a message protocol for controlling display parameters such as brightness, contrast, display orientation from the host device
 DisplayID, display identification data format, which is a replacement for E-EDID
 VESA Display Power Management Signaling (DPMS), which allows monitors to be queried on the types of power saving modes they support
 Digital Packet Video Link (DPVL), a display link standard that allows to update only portions of the screen
 VESA Stereo, a standard 3-pin connector for synchronization of stereoscopic images with LC shutter glasses
 Flat Display Mounting Interface (FDMI)
 Generalized Timing Formula (GTF), video timing standard
 Coordinated Video Timings (CVT), a replacement for GTF
 VESA Video Interface Port (VIP), a digital video interface standard
 DisplayPort (DP), a digital display interface standard
 VESA Enhanced Video Connector, an obsolete standard for reducing the number of cables around computers
 DisplayHDR, a standard to simplify HDR specifications for the display industry and consumers

Company membership
The following major companies are members of VESA.

 AMD
 Apple Inc.
 Canon Inc.
 Casio
 Dell
 Dolby Laboratories
 Foxconn
 Fujitsu
 Gigabyte Technology
 Google
 HP
 HTC
 Huawei
 Ikegami Tsushinki
 Intel Corporation
 JVC Kenwood
 Lenovo
 LG Electronics
 Maxell
 Microsoft
 NEC
 Nvidia
 Panasonic
 Samsung Electronics
 Seiko Epson
 Sony

Criticisms 

VESA has been criticized for their policy of charging non-members for some of their published standards. Some people believe the practice of charging for specifications has undermined the purpose of the VESA organization. According to Kendall Bennett, developer of the VBE/AF standard, the VESA Software Standards Committee was closed down due to a lack of interest resulting from charging high prices for specifications.  At that time no VESA standards were available for free. Although VESA now hosts some free standards documents, the free collection does not include newly developed standards. Even for obsolete standards, the free collection is incomplete. As of 2010, current standards documents from VESA cost hundreds to thousands of dollars each.  Some older standards are not available for free, or for purchase. As of 2017, the free downloads require mandatory registration.  While not all standards bodies provide specifications freely available for download, many do, including: ITU, JEDEC, DDWG, and HDMI (through HDMI 1.3a).

At the time DisplayPort was announced, VESA was criticized for developing the specification in secret and having a track record of developing unsuccessful digital interface standards, including Plug & Display and Digital Flat Panel.

References

 
Computer display standards
1989 establishments in the United States
Organizations based in San Jose, California
Organizations established in 1989